The Yellow River languages are a small family of clearly related languages,  
Namia (Namie), Ak, and Awun. 
They are classified among the Sepik languages of northern Papua New Guinea.

Namia is the most divergent Yellow River language.

Distribution
They are spoken along the Yellow River (a tributary of the Sepik) in a mountainous area of central Sandaun Province, located to the north of the Upper Sepik basin. They are located directly to the southwest of the Ram languages, another Sepik group.

Pronouns
The pronouns Ross reconstructs for proto–Yellow River are:

{| class=wikitable
|-
| I || *wan || we two || *ɨ-t || we || *ɨ(m, n)
|-
| thou || *nɨ || you two || (*kə-, *wə-p) || you || (*kə-m, *wə-m)
|-
| he || *[ə]rə || rowspan=2|they two || rowspan=2|*tə-p || rowspan=2|they || rowspan=2|*tə-m
|-
| she || *ɨ 
|}

References

 

 
Yellow–Wanibe languages
Languages of Sandaun Province